Topol is a surname. Common in the Czech Republic, Poland, Ukraine, and Russia, it originated as a place-related name for "someone who lived by a poplar tree". It is also found among Ashkenazic Jewish people speaking Eastern Yiddish and likewise refers to the poplar tree, having been borrowed from a Slavic language (see Proto-Slavic *topolь). Related surnames include Topiol, Topolansky, Topoliansky, Topolski (common in Poland), and Topolsky.

Notable people who share this surname include:
 Brad Topol (born c. 1971), American computer scientist
 Chaim Topol (1935–2023), Israeli actor, often billed mononymously as Topol
 Edward Topol (born 1938), Russian writer
 Eric Topol (born 1954), American cardiologist
 Filip Topol (1965–2013), Czech singer and songwriter
 Jáchym Topol (born 1962), Czech poet
 Josef Topol (1935–2015), Czech playwright
 Sergei Topol (born 1985), Russian ice hockey player
 Sidney Topol (1924–2022), American innovator and entrepreneur

See also

References

Czech-language surnames
Jewish surnames